Ester Lindstedt-Staaf (born 1943) is a Swedish Christian Democrat politician and physician. She was a member of the Riksdag from the constituency Hallands län from 1998 to 2002.

References

1943 births
Living people
Members of the Riksdag from the Christian Democrats (Sweden)
Women members of the Riksdag
Members of the Riksdag 1998–2002
21st-century Swedish women politicians
20th-century Swedish physicians